Copelatus tomokunii is a species of diving beetle. It is part of the genus Copelatus in the subfamily Copelatinae of the family Dytiscidae. It was described by Satô in 1985.

References

tomokunii
Beetles described in 1985